Mauro André Soares Pereira (born 6 November 1991) is a Portuguese football player who plays for Fátima.

Club career
He made his professional debut in the Segunda Liga for Mafra on 31 October 2015 in a game against Oriental.

References

External links
Mauro Pereira at ZeroZero

1991 births
Sportspeople from Coimbra
Living people
Portuguese footballers
Sertanense F.C. players
C.D. Mafra players
C.D. Fátima players
Liga Portugal 2 players
Association football defenders